() is a type of Low-German-coloured dialect or sociolect of German. It is characterised by Low-German-type structures and the presence of numerous calques and loanwords from Low German in High German.

Description 
This is the result of linguistic, cultural, educational and political Germanisation of the region that is now Northern Germany. This process of Germanisation began in earnest in the late seventeenth century, after the demise of the Hanseatic League and thus the erosion of its Middle-Saxon-speaking power. Pressures to adopt German and at the same time being held back by insufficient access to formal (by now solely German language) education in the lower social classes led to various stages of transition from Low German to High German. These generally low-prestige language varieties continued to be spoken (rarely written) until the late 20th century, though some people still continue and promote them now, very often for their supposed entertainment value, typically in comical veins.

Mamma aus'n Fenster: "Klein Erna, muscha die Katze nich immer an Schwanz ziehn!" Klein Erna: "Tu ich scha auch gaa nich. Die Katze zieht immer, ich halt ihr bloß fest!" (Mum callin' down from the window: "Li'l Erna, stop pullin' the cat's tail, will ya?!" Li’l Erna: "But it ain't me doin' it! The cat keeps pullin'. I'm jus' holdin' 'er.")
Mamma: "Klein Erna, komm ra-auf, Füße waschen, Mamma braucht die Kumme gleich zu Sala-at!" (Mum: "Li'l Erna, come on upstai-airs! Time to wash yer fee-eet! Mum needs the bowl for saaalad!")
Klein Erna geht mit ihr'n Heini in Dunkeln spazieren. Und wie sie inne Gegend von Bismarckdenkmal sind und 'n büschen rumknutschen, sagt Klein Erna mit'n mal: "Heini, wis ma sehn, wo ich an Blinddaam opariert bin?" "O ja, Klein Erna, zeig mal her!" "Kuck mal, da unten, wo die vielen Lichter brennen, da is das Hafenkrankenhaus. Da bin ich an Blinddaam opariert!" (Li'l Erna's walkin' with 'er Ricky in the dark. An' as they're by the Bismarck Memorial an' are doin' a bit o' knoodlin', says Erna, "Say, Ricky, d'ya wanna see where I had my appendix out?" "Oh, yes, Li'l Erna. Come on! Show me!" "Look, down there, where all the lights are, that's where the Harbour Hospital is. That's where I had my appendix out.")

From a linguistic point of view,  varieties did not become extinct as such. They merely developed into more "cleaned-up" northern varieties of German, varieties that use numerous  elements, especially in their casual registers. As such,  has been influencing the development of Standard German, mostly indirectly by way of northern German dialect contributions. Obvious examples are Low Saxon loanwords such as  'bye' (compare Low Saxon:). However, most influences are not as clearly noticeable as they involve lexical and idiomatic choices.

These are found in many situations in which languages came to be supplanted by other languages.

While there have been many varieties of  throughout Northern Germany, those of larger cities are best known, such as those of Hamburg, Bielefeld, Bremen, Flensburg and Danzig.

The name  refers to the city of Meissen, which lies outside the traditional Saxon-speaking region (although the state in which it is situated at one time acquired the misleading name Saxony, originally the name of what is now Northern Germany). Meissen's Central German dialect was considered exemplary and was highly influential between the fifteenth century and the establishment of Modern Standard German.

 is not a dialect of Low German. Furthermore, it is also not simply High German with a Low German accent, as it is often described. Its Low German/Low Saxon influences are not restricted to its phonology but involve morphological and syntactic structures (sentence construction) and its lexicon (vocabulary) as well. It is a type of German variety with the minimally qualifying characteristic of a clearly noticeable Low German/Low Saxon substratum.

Berlin is still surrounded by traditionally Low-German-speaking areas of the southeastern or Brandenburg type. Before it became the center of the Prussian state, Berlin, too, was Low-German-speaking. As such it adopted German earlier than did other northern centers. Typical  is thus technically a Missingsch group with an additional Western Slavic (probably Old Lower Sorbian) substratum, since before Saxon and Low Franconian colonisation the area was Slavic-speaking.

Phonological characteristics

Missingsch phonology tends to be closely related, if not identical, to that of the corresponding Low Saxon varieties. Noteworthy among these in the Northern Low Saxon area are the following:
Long  is pronounced as a weakly rounded back vowel  as in most Low Saxon varieties; e.g. Abend  ~  (Standard ) 'evening', Straßenbahn  (Standard ) 'tramway', 'streetcar'.
Short vowels are lengthened before sonorants, without any other change of articulation; e.g. Ball  'ball', Kind  'child', auch  'also', Land  'land', 'country'.
There is a noticeable degree of nasalisation before syllable-final nasal consonants; Kind  'child', Köm  'caraway schnapps', lang  'long'.
 is assimilated to preceding ; e.g. Kinder = Kinner  'children', anders = anners  'different'.
Straße  (Standard , Low Saxon Straat ) 'street', Sprache  (Standard , Low Saxon Spraak ) 'language'. This pronunciation is now rare, at least among younger speakers.
What are word-initial affricate consonants (z and pf) in standard German tend to be fricative in Missingsch; e.g. Zeit  'time', Pferd  'horse' (cf. Standard Zeit , Pferd ). While this is now less common with z, it is prevails with pf (in which case it also occurs in Central German areas, which also do not feature the distinctly Upper German pf).
Aspiration of voiceless stops and affricates is limited to the syllable with main stress; e.g. Pocke  (Standard ) 'pock', pikant  (Standard ) 'spicy', Peter  (Standard ) 'Peter', Papa  (Standard  or ) 'dad'. (Unaspirated variants tend to be heard and spelled as voiced by the average North German, hence the spelling Pogge, Peder and Pabba.)
Syllable-final  is realized as a vowel and merges with certain preceding vowels; e.g. fertig  ~  'ready’', ‘completed’, warten  ~  'to wait', Korb  ~  'basket', Körper  'body'
Preceding a syllable-final velar consonant,  tends to change into a high vowel; e.g. Milch  (Standard ) 'milk', Balken  (Standard ) 'beam', solch  (Standard ) 'such', welk  (Standard ) 'withered', Erfolg  (Standard ) 'success'. (Similar cases of assimilation of  can be observed in Bavarian German).
Final  is always pronounced as a fricative, and the preceding vowel is usually short; e.g. richtig  (southern ) 'correct', Tag  (southern ) 'day', Berg  'mountain', 'hill', Zug  ~  (southern ) 'train', 'draught', weg  (southern ) 'away', but Weg  (southern ) 'way' (cf. Low Saxon: richtig  'correct', Dag  'day', Barg  'mountain', 'hill', Tog  'train', 'draught', weg  'away', but Weg  'way’'vs Weeg’  ~  'ways'). To express this orthographically, many people spell these richtich, Tach, Berch, Zuch, wech and Weech respectively (in Low Saxon richtich, Dach, Barch, Toch, wech, Wech and Weeg ~ Weech respectively).
In original Missingsch, syllable-initial  is apical (as in Italian and as in original Low Saxon). Uvular  (as in Standard French, Danish and Modern Hebrew) became acceptable with advanced Germanisation. (The same happened to Low Saxon in some communities.)

Lexical characteristics

Missingsch uses numerous Low Saxon words and expressions:
phonologically adapted loans; e.g.
Buddel  (< Low Saxon Buddel , cf. Standard German Flasche) 'bottle'
dröge ~ dröög ~ drööch '(awfully) dry' (e.g. food), 'boring' (< Low Saxon dröge  ~ dröög’  'dry') in addition to ordinary German-based trocken  'dry'
Fahrtuch  (< Low Saxon Fahrdook , cf. German Wischtuch) 'cleaning rag'
Klöterbüchse  (< Low Saxon Klœterbüx(e)  ~ , Standard German Rassel) '(baby) rattle'
Schiet  inoffensive for 'dirt', 'inferior stuff', 'problem', 'nuisance', 'nonsense' (< Low Saxon Schiet with the same meanings) in addition to the offensive German-based cognate Scheiße 'shit', 'crap'
Sott  ~ Sutt  (< Low Saxon Sott  ~ Sutt , cf. Standard German Ruß) (1) 'soot', (2) 'luck'
Sottje  ~  ~ Suttje  ~  (< Low Saxon Sottje  ~  ~ Suttje  ~  < Sott  ~ Sutt ; 'soot', cf. Standard German Schornsteinfeger) 'chimney-sweep'
calques and semi-calques; e.g. 
Bickbeere  (< Low Saxon Bickbeer  ~ , cf. Standard German Blaubeere, Heidelbeere) 'blueberry'
Blumenpott  (< Low Saxon Blomenpott , cf. Standard German Blumentopf) 'flowerpot'
Grünhöker  (< Low Saxon Gröönhœker  ~ , cf. Standard German Gemüsehändler) 'greengrocer'
Grünzeug  ~  (< Grööntüüg  ~ , cf. Standard German Gemüse) 'vegetable(s)'
Handstein  ~  (< Low Saxon Handsteen , cf. Standard German Waschbecken) 'wash basin'
Kantstein  ~  (< Low Saxon Kantsteen , cf. Standard German Bordstein) 'curb stone'
Stickhusten  ~  (< Low Saxon Stickhoosten , cf. Standard German Keuchhusten) 'whooping cough'
Wurzel  ~  (< Low Saxon Wortel  ~ Wottel , literally ‘root’) 'carrot' (cf. Standard German Möhre 'carrot', Wurzel 'root') 
zus(ch)nacken  ~  ~  ~  (< Low Saxon tosnacken , cf. Standard German zureden, ermuntern) 'encourage'

Many of the above-mentioned words are used in casual-style Northern German dialects that descended from Missingsch at least in part.

Morphological and syntactic characteristics

as in some Low Saxon dialects, no distinctive marking for dative case and accusative case, using one or the other German marker for both cases; e.g. 
Wenn du mich (dat.) das nich geben tus(t), denn kanns(t) du mich (acc.) nich besuchen or Wenn du mir (dat.) das nich geben tus(t), denn kanns(t) du mir (acc.) nich besuchen (cf. Low Saxon: Wenn du mi dat nich geven deihs(t), denn kanns(t) (du) mi nich besöken, Standard German: Wenn du es mir nicht gibst, darfst du mich nicht besuchen.) 'If you don't give it to me (dat.) you may not visit me (acc.).'
Genitive constructions are as in Low Saxon; e.g.
seine Deerns Fernseher, seine Deern ihr Fernseher, der Fernseher von seine Deern (cf. Low Saxon: sien Deerns Feernseher, sien Deern ehr Feernseher, de Feernseher vun sien Deern, Standard German: der Fernsehapparat seiner Freundin) 'his girlfriend's television set'
In the Northern Low Saxon area, Missingsch uses das for both 'that' (Standard German das, Low Saxon dat) and 'it' (Standard German es, Low Saxon it, in some dialects dat); e.g. 
Ich mach das nich. (cf. Low Saxon: Ik mag dat nich.) 1. 'I don't like that.' (Standard German: Ich mag das nicht, Mir gefällt das nicht.), 2. 'I don't like it.' (Standard German: Ich mag es nicht, Mir gefällt es nicht.) (N.B.: The Missingsch sentence Ich mach das nich can also mean 'I don't do that/it', because what in Standard German is (ich) mag '(I) like' in Missingsch coalesces with what in Standard German is (ich) mache '(I) make'.)
tun ‘do’ used to emphasise verbs; e.g.
Arbeiten tu ich heute nich. (cf. Low Saxon: Arbeiden do ik vundaag nich, Standard German: Ich arbeite heute nicht.) 'I don't work today (but I do something else).'
Tu ihn das man mal geben! (cf. Low Saxon: Do em dat man mal geven!, Standard German: Gib es ihm nur!) 'Do give it to him!', 'Go on and give it to him!'
man (< Low Saxon man 'only', cf. Standard German nur ‘only’) used to signal permission, advice or mild command; e.g.
Denn komm Sie man rein! (cf. Low Saxon: Denn kümmt (Se) man rin!, Standard German: Dann kommen Sie nur herein!) 'Come on inside then!'
Lass ihr man! (cf. Low Saxon: Laat ehr man!, Standard German Lasse sie nur!) 'You'd better let her be', 'Don't mind her!', 'Forget about her!'
Da (there) and hier (here) are not compounded with a following prepositions; e.g.
Da habbich kein Geld für (cf. Low Saxon: Dor heff ik keen Geld för, Standard German: Dafür habe ich kein Geld.) 'I don't have any money (to spare) for that/it.'
Hast (du) da was gegen?, Hassa was gegen? (cf. Low Saxon: Hest (du) dor wat gegen?, Standard German: Hast du etwas dagegen?) 'Do you have anything against that/it?', 'Are you opposed to that/it?', 'Do you have any objection?'
Da! Hier kannst dir maal was Schönes von kaufen. (cf. Low Saxon: Dor! Hier kannst di mal wat Schööns vun köpen. Standard German: Da! Hiervon kannst du dir einmal etwas Schönes kaufen.) 'Here you go! Buy yourself something nice with this.'
Mach das Fenster auf! ~ Machas Fenster auf! (< Low Saxon Maak dat Finster op!, cf. Standard German Öffne das Fenster!, colloquial also Mach das Fenster auf! with the imperative of the verb aufmachen) 'Open the window!'
Die Tür könn wir nu zumachen (< Low Saxon De Döör künnt wi nu tomaken, cf. Standard German Die Tür können wir jetzt schließen, colloquial also Die Tür können wir jetzt/nun zumachen) 'We can close the door now.'
Bei die aufe Tür kommp all so’n Viechzeug rein (< Low Saxon Bi de oppe Döör kümmt all so’n Krimmeltüüg rin!, cf. Standard German Bei offener Tür kommt alles mögliche Viehzeug herein, Bei offener Tür kommen alle möglichen Viecher herein) 'All kinds of critters come inside when the door is open.'
Bei die zue Gardine kann ich nich lesen (< Low Saxon Bi de toe Gardien kann ik nich lesen, cf. Standard German Wenn die Gardine zugezogen ist, kann ich nicht lesen) 'I can't read when the curtain is pulled shut.'

See also
Berlinerisch
Hamburgisch
Portuñol
Creole language
Language contact

External links
 Sample Text in Bremen Missingsch (with sound) (Low Saxon version: ,)
 Sample Text in Hamburg Missingsch (with sound) (Low Saxon version: ,)

German language
Low German
Central German languages
German dialects
Macaronic language